Nova Varoš is a town and municipality located in the Zlatibor District of southwestern Serbia. The municipality of Nova Varoš has a population of 16,638, while the town of Nova Varoš itself has a population of 8,795 inhabitants.

History 
Nova Varoš was founded in the middle of the 16th century. It is associated with the name of Skender Pasha of Genoa. When Skender-pasha, travelling from Bosnia to the Ottoman capital of Constantinople (1530), stopped with his entourage on the plateau below the mountain Zlatar and was delighted with the beauty of this wooded area and the intoxicating smell of pine, he ordered a town to be built there. Settlements soon sprang up on the site of today's Nova Varoš. It was called Skender-pašina palanka (Skender-pasha's Palanka). When it grew to close to 2,000 houses, "a fire broke out and burned the palace to the ground" (Evliya Çelebi). Most of the inhabitants stayed there and built a new town which they called Nova Kasaba, which in Serbian means Nova Varoš.

Geography
Nova Varoš is located in southwest Serbia, the main road that connects the north of the country the Montenegrin coast. It is situated at 1000 meters above sea level, and below the northern slopes of mountain Zlatar. Nova Varoš is located in the Dinaric mountain range. North of town is mountain Murtenica, while the south mountain Zlatar.

Climate
Nova Varoš has an oceanic climate (Köppen climate classification: Cfb).

Demographics

According to the last official census done in 2011, the Municipality of Nova Varoš has 16,638 inhabitants. Population density on the territory of the municipality is 28.6 inhabitants per square kilometer.

Ethnic groups
In 1991, the population of the municipality was composed of: Serbs and Montenegrins (89.20%), ethnic Muslims (8.51%) and others.

In 2002, the population of the municipality was composed of: Serbs (18,001) (90.09%), Bosniaks (1,028) (5.15%), ethnic Muslims (502) (2.51%) and others. Most of those who in 1991 census declared themselves as Muslims by ethnicity, in the next census in 2002 declared themselves as Bosniaks, while the smaller number of them still declare themselves as Muslims by ethnicity.

Ethnic composition of the municipality:

Settlements
Aside from the town of Nova Varoš, the municipality includes the following settlements:

 Akmačići
 Amzići
 Bistrica
 Božetići
 Brdo
 Bukovik
 Burađa
 Vilovi
 Vraneša
 Gornje Trudovo
 Debelja
 Draglica
 Draževići
 Drmanovići
 Jasenovo
 Komarani
 Kućani
 Ljepojevići
 Miševići
 Negbina
 Ojkovica
 Radijevići
 Radoinja
 Rutoši
 Seništa
 Tisovica
 Trudovo
 Čelice
 Štitkovo

Economy
The following table gives a preview of total number of registered people employed in legal entities per their core activity (as of 2018):

Culture
 Janja Monastery
 Dubnica Monastery

Gallery

Notable people
 Gavrilo I, Serbian Patriarch
 Petar Bojović, military commander and field marshal
 Ljubinko Drulović, former footballer, 2013 European U19 Championship winning manager
 Nemanja Nedović, basketball player, silver medalist at the 2016 Summer Olympics
 Vladimir Otašević, footballer
 Bojana Lečić, 2011 Miss Serbia
 Ivan Šaponjić, footballer

See also
 List of places in Serbia
 Sandžak

References

External links 

 
 Zlatar Info

Populated places in Zlatibor District
Raška District
Municipalities and cities of Šumadija and Western Serbia